San Marco is one of the six sestieri of Venice, lying in the heart of the city as the main place of Venice.  San Marco also includes the island of San Giorgio Maggiore.  Although the district includes Saint Mark's Square, that was never administered as part of the sestiere.

Overview
The small district includes many of Venice's most famous sights, including St Mark's Square, Saint Mark's Basilica, the Doge's Palace, Harry's Bar, the Palazzo Dandolo, Palazzo Corner Contarini dei Cavalli, Palazzo Corner Valmarana, Palazzo D'Anna Viaro Martinengo Volpi di Misurata, Palazzo Cavalli, San Moisè, the La Fenice theatre, the Palazzo Grassi and Palazzo Bellavite, and the churches of San Beneto, San Fantin, Santa Maria del Giglio, San Maurizio, San Moisè, Santo Stefano, San Salvador, San Zulian and San Samuele.

The area is densely built and was the location of Venice's government.  It is now heavily touristed and there are many hotels, banks and expensive shops.

San Marco is also a place which is used in several video games such as in Tekken, Assassin's Creed II, and Venetica.

See also
Oratorio di Sant'Angelo degli Zoppi
Sestieri of Venice

References

External links
High-resolution 360° Panoramas and Images of San Marco | Art Atlas

 
Sestieri of Venice